Christopher Duncan McLean Melville (born 4 October 1935) is a former South African first-class cricketer who played for Oxford University in 1956 and 1957. 

Melville's uncle was the South African Test captain Alan Melville. Christopher went to school at Michaelhouse before going to Trinity College, Oxford. A middle-order batsman, he was Oxford's most successful batsman in 1957, scoring 715 runs at an average of 37.63, with a highest score of 142, made out of a team total of 262, against Leicestershire.

After he graduated with an honours degree in Jurisprudence he returned to South Africa and joined the Anglo American mining company in Johannesburg.

References

External links
 
 

1935 births
Living people
South African cricketers
Cricketers from Pietermaritzburg
Oxford University cricketers
Alumni of Michaelhouse
Alumni of Trinity College, Oxford